Trichocoleaceae is a family of liverworts in the order  Jungermanniales.

References

External links

Liverwort families
Jungermanniales